Pierre Sagna (born 21 August 1990) is a Senegalese footballer who plays for C.D. Santa Clara as a full back.

International career
Sagna was born in Senegal, and moved to the France at the age of 10 - he is eligible for both national teams, but prefers to aim for the Senegal national football team.

Career statistics

Honors
Moreirense
Taça da Liga: 2016–17

Notes

References

External links

1990 births
Living people
People from Dakar
Senegalese footballers
French footballers
Senegalese emigrants to France
Association football defenders
Primeira Liga players
Liga Portugal 2 players
Super League Greece players
Valenciennes FC players
G.D. Chaves players
Moreirense F.C. players
Belenenses SAD players
Panetolikos F.C. players
C.D. Santa Clara players
Senegalese expatriate footballers
Senegalese expatriate sportspeople in Portugal
French expatriate footballers
French expatriate sportspeople in Portugal
Expatriate footballers in Portugal
Expatriate footballers in Greece